The Rural Municipality of Big Quill No. 308 is a rural municipality (RM) in the Canadian province of Saskatchewan within Census Division No. 10 and  Division No. 4. It is located in the east-central portion of the province.

History
The RM of Big Quill No. 308 incorporated as a rural municipality on December 13, 1909.

There are two places on the Canadian Register of Historic Places in the RM of Big Qill:
Amma's House on the Yellowhead Highway approximately 17 kilometres west of Wynyard was built by Icelandic carpenters in 1919.
St. John Bohoslav Krasne Ukrainian Catholic Church approximately 20 kilometres south-east of Wynyard was built in 1940.

Geography

Communities and localities 
The following urban municipalities are surrounded by the RM.

Towns
Wynyard

The following unincorporated communities are located within the RM.

Organized hamlets
 Kandahar

Special service areas
Dafoe

Localities
 Copeland
 Krasne

Demographics 

Government
The RM of Big Quill No. 308 is governed by an elected municipal council and an appointed administrator that meets on the second Wednesday of every month. The reeve of the RM is Howie Linnen while its administrator is Santana Dawson. The RM's office is located in Wynyard.

See also
List of communities in Saskatchewan
List of historic places in Saskatchewan

References 

B

Division No. 10, Saskatchewan